Guy Husson (born March 2, 1931) is a retired French track and field athlete known primarily for the hammer throw.  He was born in Vitry-sur-Seine, Val-de-Marne, France.  He represented his native country in three Olympics from 1956 to 1964.  He was a finalist in 1956, finishing in 13th place.  He also represented France at the 1954 and 1958 European Athletics Championships; and the 1955 and 1963 Mediterranean Games.

He set his personal best of 69.40 at a home meet in Aix les Bains at the age of 36.  The throw turned out to be a Masters M35 World Record, which stood for almost two years until it was surpassed by the same Hal Connolly who took the gold medal in 1956.  Such was the improvement in the event, Husson's throw was more than 6 meters further than Connolly's Olympic winning throw (and Olympic record) 11 years earlier.

References

Living people
1931 births
French male hammer throwers
Athletes (track and field) at the 1956 Summer Olympics
Athletes (track and field) at the 1960 Summer Olympics
Athletes (track and field) at the 1964 Summer Olympics
Olympic athletes of France
Mediterranean Games silver medalists for France
Mediterranean Games medalists in athletics
Athletes (track and field) at the 1955 Mediterranean Games
Athletes (track and field) at the 1963 Mediterranean Games